Mark Hogan may refer to:
 Mark Anthony Hogan (1931–2017), Lieutenant Governor of Colorado, 1967–1971
 Mark Hogan of the band Hogan